HD 126141 is a suspected variable star in the northern constellation of Boötes.

References

External links
 HR 5387
 Image HD 126141

Boötes
126141
070310
F-type main-sequence stars
5387
Suspected variables
Durchmusterung objects